Hatia Assembly constituency   is an assembly constituency in the Indian state of Jharkhand.

Members of Assembly 
 2005: Gopal Sharan Nath Shahdeo, Indian National Congress
 2009: Gopal Sharan Nath Shahdeo, Indian National Congress
 2012: Navin Jaiswal, All Jharkhand Students Union, By Poll
 2014: Navin Jaiswal, Jharkhand Vikas Morcha (Prajatantrik)
 2015: Navin Jaiswal, Bharatiya Janata Party * [Six JVM(P) MLAs join BJP in Jharkhand]
 2019: Navin Jaiswal, Bharatiya Janata Party

See also
Vidhan Sabha
List of states of India by type of legislature

References
Schedule – XIII of Constituencies Order, 2008 of Delimitation of Parliamentary and Assembly constituencies Order, 2008 of the Election Commission of India 
http://www.thehindu.com/news/national/other-states/six-jvmp-mlas-join-bjp/article6882145.ece

Assembly constituencies of Jharkhand